Orville Devane Cochran (March 10, 1871 - January 30, 1948) was a lawyer and Democratic politician in the U.S. territory of Alaska. Cochran served as mayor of Nome from 1910 to 1911, and served as the City Attorney for Nome. He was elected to the Alaska Territorial House of Representatives, 5th regular session in 1921, and elected as a member of the Alaska Territorial Senate for the 13th to 18th sessions inclusive, regular sessions and the special session of 1946. Cochran was appointed to the Board of University of Alaska in 1939 where he served until his death in 1948. Cochran was born in Virgil City, Missouri and went to school in Parsons, Kansas. Cochran lived in Portland, Oregon and practiced law. In 1900, he moved to Nome and continued to practice law.

References

External links 
bio on University of Alaska site

1871 births
1948 deaths
20th-century American lawyers
Alaska Democrats
Alaska lawyers
Lawyers from Portland, Oregon
Mayors of places in Alaska
Members of the Alaska Territorial Legislature
People from Nome, Alaska
University of Alaska regents